The 2012 Austin Peay Governors football team represented Austin Peay State University during the 2012 NCAA Division I FCS football season. They were led by sixth-year head coach Rick Christophel and played their home games at Governors Stadium. They are a member of the Ohio Valley Conference. They finished the season 2–9, 1–7 in OVC play to finish in eighth place.

Schedule

Source: Schedule

References

Austin Peay
Austin Peay Governors football seasons
Austin Peay Governors football